The Liga ASOBAL 2012–13 was the 23rd season since its establishment. Barcelona Intersport was the defending champions. The campaign began on Friday, 7 September 2012. The last matchday was played on Saturday, 25 May 2013. A total of 16 teams contested the league, 14 of which had already contested in the 2011–12 season, and two of which were promoted from the División de Plata 2011–12.

Barcelona Borges won their third title in a row gathering twelve ASOBAL titles.

The season was marked by the shutdown of BM Atlético Madrid at end of season due to financial constraints.

Promotion and relegation 
Teams promoted from 2011–12 División de Plata
Frigoríficos del Morrazo
ARS Palma del Río
Villa de Aranda

Teams relegated to 2012–13 División de Plata
None (0)

Teams dissolved
BM Antequera
CB Torrevieja
SDC San Antonio

Teams

League table 

'' BM Atlético Madrid was disbanded at end of season.

Awards
Ideal team is

Individual awards

Statistics

Top goalscorers

Top goalkeepers

See also
División de Plata de Balonmano 2012–13

References

External links
Liga ASOBAL

Liga ASOBAL seasons
1
Spa